Figure skating at the 2011 European Youth Olympic Winter Festival took place at the Tipsort Arena in Liberec, Czech Republic between February 12 and 19, 2011. Skaters competed in the disciplines of men's singles and ladies' singles.

Medal summary

Medalists

Medal table

Results

Men

Ladies

References

External links
 Results

Figure skating
European Youth Olympics
2011
2011 European Youth Olympics